Fernando Fernandes (born 25 November 1971) is an Angolan former footballer.

Career
Fernandes attended Sacred Heart University, playing on the men's soccer team. In 1998, he signed with the Long Island Rough Riders. On 11 August 1999, he went on loan to the MetroStars of Major League Soccer for one game. He had played for the Rough Riders earlier in the day, giving him a game with two different teams in two different leagues in one day.  In 2000, he began the season with the Connecticut Wolves, but returned to the Rough Riders at mid-season.

References

External links
Player profile at MetroFanatic.com
All Time Rough Riders stats

1971 births
Living people
Angolan expatriate footballers
Angolan expatriate sportspeople in the United States
Angolan footballers
Association football midfielders
Connecticut Wolves players
Long Island Rough Riders players
Major League Soccer players
New York Red Bulls players
Place of birth missing (living people)